Ryan Kiera Armstrong (born March 10, 2010) is an American actress.  She is known for portraying Charlie McGee in the 2022 film Firestarter. She also portrayed Brooke in The Old Way (2023).  On television, she portrayed Alma Gardner in American Horror Story: Double Feature (2021).

Personal life

Armstrong was born to Dr. Berta Bacic and actor Dean Armstrong and is the youngest of five children.

Select filmography
Film

Television

References

External links
 

2010 births
Living people
Actresses from New York City
Actresses from New York (state)
American television actresses
American film actresses
American people of Irish descent
American people of Croatian descent
21st-century American actresses